Joachim Baldauf (* 20 July 1965 in Weiler, Germany) is a German photographer and publisher. He currently lives in Berlin.

Biography

Joachim Baldauf began his studies in textile design at the Technikum Reutlingen in 1984, where he graduated with a degree in 1987. He went on to create textile designs for Holzhauser Textildesign, Rueff Muntlix, Stragapede Didra and others.
From 1989 to 1998, Baldauf worked as a graphic designer and art director for magazines and other clients such as Adidas, Bertelsmann Music Group, Cosmopolitan, Doc Martens, Helmut Lang/Sucrow-Barthel, Levi's, MAC and others.
In 1992, together with Gabriele Grammelsberger and Dieter Brachtl, he founded the agency Boom Communication in Munich, which published magazines including Nachtschwärmer and Lavabo.
Since 1998, Joachim Baldauf has worked as a freelance photographer for numerous international magazines and has photographed a variety of advertising campaigns.
Baldauf also supports charity projects through his work with organisations such as Doctors Without Borders, the Altonaer Museum, the German Red Cross, Dunkelziffer e.V., Internationales Kindercamp Sans Souci and Pro Organ.
From 1999 to 2002 he collaborated extensively with the London-based magazine Wallpaper*, where he was responsible for approximately 30 editorials and covers.
In 2004, together with the graphic designer Agnes Feckl, Baldauf founded the publishing house Printkultur, which publishes the magazine Vorn as well as a variety of books.
Since 2009, he has worked as a lecturer and guest speaker at various universities, including the Maastricht Academy of Fine Arts and Design, the Dortmund University of Applied Sciences and Arts, Fefè Project in Rome, the University of the Arts Bremen, the Hochschule für Technik und Wirtschaft in Berlin, the Merz Akademie in Stuttgart and the Berlin University of the Arts.

Exhibitions

Since 2002, Joachim Baldauf has been the subject of various solo exhibitions, and he has also participated in a number of group exhibitions in galleries and institutions.
 Jeden Tag ein wenig, AMD, Munich, 2002
 Der subjektive Mann, Galerie Rössler, Munich, 2002
 Le charme discret de la bourgeoisie, Galerie Viaux, Hamburg, 2003
 Deichtorhallen/Haus der Photographie, Hamburg, 2003, 2004, 2005, 2007
 Private Collection, curated by Thorsten Heinze, Sevenstargallery, Berlin, 2007
 Mode ist tot – Von Virusverbreitern und Gratwanderern, curated by Werner Hanak-Lettner, Haus Wittgenstein, Vienna, 2008
 Be an Angel, Camerawork, Berlin, 2008
 Fashion, Camerawork, Berlin, 2009
 The Wallpaper* Years, curated by Claudia Seidel, Galerie im Regierungsviertel, Berlin, 2009
 Meissen Macht Ikonen, curated by Claudia Seidel, Albrechtsburg, Meissen, 2010
 Lingering Whispers, curated by Predrag Pajdic and Claudia Seidel, Crypt of St Pancras Church, London, 2010
 Liebet!, Perfectprops, Vienna, 2010

Awards

Joachim Baldauf and Printkultur have received numerous prizes and awards, including several International Art Directors Club Awards and Lead Awards, a Creative Club Austria Award, a Swiss Photo Award, Cover of the Year and a Distinctive Merit Award.

Printkultur publications
 Vorn, issue no. 1, 244 pages, Printkultur (2004), limited edition
 Vorn, issue no. 2, 268 pages, Printkultur (2004), limited edition
 Vorn, issue no. 3, 252 pages, Printkultur (2006), limited edition
 Vorn, issue no. 4, 250 pages, Printkultur (2007), limited edition
 Vorn, issue no. 5, 250 pages, Printkultur (2008), limited edition
 Wendy Iles: A Book About Hair, 228 pages, Printkultur (2008), 
 Tina Berning: 100 Girls On Cheap Paper, 192 pages, Printkultur (2009), 
 Christina Kruse: Reisetagebuch 1–5, 254 pages, Printkultur (2009), no ISBN
 Vorn, issue no. 6, 240 pages, Printkultur & Claudia Seidel (2010), limited edition
 Vorn, issue no. 7, 240 pages, Printkultur & Uta Grosenick (2014),

Publications
 Joachim Baldauf: Photographs + The Wallpaper* Years, 384 pages, Distanz Verlag (2013), 

With a conversation between Tyler Brûlé, founder and former editorial director of Wallpaper* and current editor-in-chief of Monocle, and Ariel Childs, former editor of photography at Wallpaper*; a text by Tillmann Prüfer, an editor at Die Zeit and style director at Zeit Magazin; and a foreword by Uta Grosenick, cofounder of Distanz Verlag.

References

External links 
 Website of Joachim Baldauf

1965 births
Living people
Photographers from Berlin
German publishers (people)